General elections are scheduled to be held in Argentina on 22 October 2023, to elect the president, members of the national congress and the governors of most provinces. Incumbent president Alberto Fernández is eligible for a second term.

Presidential candidates

Confirmed

Juntos por el Cambio 
 Horacio Rodríguez Larreta (PRO), current mayor of Buenos Aires
 Patricia Bullrich (PRO), former minister of security (2015–2019)
 Gerardo Morales (UCR), current governor of Jujuy Province

La Libertad Avanza 
 Javier Milei, national deputy

Freemen of the South Movement 

 Jesús Escobar, former provincial deputy in Neuquén

Potential
, the following people have declared interest or have been subjects of speculation about their potential candidacy within the previous six months.

Frente de Todos 
 Alberto Fernández (PJ), current president of Argentina and former chief of cabinet of ministers (2003–2008)
 Sergio Massa (FR), Minister of Economy and former president of the Chamber of Deputies (2019–2022)
 Eduardo de Pedro (PJ), Minister of the Interior
 Daniel Scioli (PJ), current Argentine ambassador to Brazil and former governor of Buenos Aires Province (2007–2015)
  (FPG), social leader and activist

Juntos por el Cambio 

 María Eugenia Vidal (PRO), national deputy and former governor of Buenos Aires Province (2015–2019)
 Mauricio Macri (PRO), former president of Argentina (2015–2019)
  (UCR), national deputy
 Miguel Ángel Pichetto (ERF), former national senator (2001–2019)
Elisa Carrió (CC ARI), former national deputy (2009–2020) and presidential candidate

Federal Alternative 
 Juan Schiaretti (PJ–HPC), current governor of Córdoba Province
 Juan Manuel Urtubey (PJ), former governor of Salta Province (2007–2019)

Workers' Left Front 
 Myriam Bregman (PTS), national deputy
  (PO), Buenos Aires City legislator
 Celeste Fierro (MST)

Declined to run
 Cristina Fernández de Kirchner (PJ–FDT), current vice president and former president (2007–2015).
 José Luis Espert (AL), national deputy
 Nicolás del Caño (PTS–FIT), national deputy and former presidential candidate
 Carlos Maslatón (LLA), former legislator of Buenos Aires (1987–1991)

Electoral system

The election of the president will be conducted under the ballotage system, a modified version of the two-round system. A candidate can win the presidency in a single round by either winning 45% of the vote, or if they win 40% of the vote while finishing 10 percentage points ahead of the second-place candidate. If no candidate meets either threshold, a runoff takes place between the top two candidates. Voting is compulsory for citizens between 18 and 70 years old. Suffrage is also extended to 16- and 17-year-olds, though without compulsory voting.

Congress

Chamber of Deputies 
The 257 members of the Chamber of Deputies are elected by proportional representation in 24 multi-member constituencies based on the provinces (plus the City of Buenos Aires). Seats are allocated using the d'Hondt method with a 3% electoral threshold. In this election, 130 of the 257 seats are up for renewal for a four-year term.

Senate 
The 72 members of the Senate are elected in the same 24 constituencies, with three seats in each. The party receiving the most votes in each constituency wins two seats, with the third seat awarded to the second-placed party. The 2023 elections will see one-third of Senators renewed, with eight provinces electing three Senators for a 6-year term; Buenos Aires, Formosa, Jujuy, La Rioja, Misiones, San Juan, San Luis and Santa Cruz.

Opinion polls

Presidential election

References

Argentina
Elections in Argentina
Presidential elections in Argentina